Douglassville is a town in Cass County, Texas, United States. The population was 229 at the 2010 census, up from 175 at the 2000 census. In 2020, its population was 211.

Geography
Highway 8 leads north  to Maud and south  to Linden, the Cass County seat, while Highway 77 leads southeast  to Atlanta and west  to Naples.

Demographics

As of the census of 2000, there were 175 people, 76 households, and 52 families residing in the town. The population density was 27.7 people per square mile (10.7/km2). There were 87 housing units at an average density of 13.8 per square mile (5.3/km2). The racial makeup of the town was 83.43% White, 15.43% African American, 0.57% Native American, and 0.57% from two or more races. Hispanic or Latino of any race were 0.57% of the population.

There were 76 households, out of which 27.6% had children under the age of 18 living with them, 57.9% were married couples living together, 7.9% had a female householder with no husband present, and 30.3% were non-families. 30.3% of all households were made up of individuals, and 15.8% had someone living alone who was 65 years of age or older. The average household size was 2.30 and the average family size was 2.85.

In the town, the population was spread out, with 25.1% under the age of 18, 3.4% from 18 to 24, 29.7% from 25 to 44, 20.6% from 45 to 64, and 21.1% who were 65 years of age or older. The median age was 41 years. For every 100 females, there were 96.6 males. For every 100 females age 18 and over, there were 87.1 males.

The median income for a household in the town was $37,188, and the median income for a family was $48,750. Males had a median income of $27,250 versus $26,875 for females. The per capita income for the town was $15,992. About 3.7% of families and 8.9% of the population were below the poverty line, including 15.5% of those under the age of eighteen and 3.8% of those 65 or over.

Education
Douglassville is served by the Atlanta Independent School District.

References

Towns in Cass County, Texas
Towns in Texas